Myron Frederick "Moose" Grimshaw (November 30, 1875 – December 11, 1936) was a right fielder in Major League Baseball who played from  through  for the Boston Americans. He was born in St. Johnsville, New York, but raised in Canajoharie, New York.

In a three-season career, Grimshaw was a .256 hitter (229-for-894) with four home runs and 116 RBI in 259 games, including 104 runs, 31 doubles, 16 triples, and 15 stolen bases.

Grimshaw died on December 11, 1936, in Canajoharie, New York at the age of 61.

Sources

Boston Americans players
Major League Baseball first basemen
Baseball players from New York (state)
London Cockneys players
Guelph Maple Leafs players
Chatham Reds players
Buffalo Bisons (minor league) players
Toronto Maple Leafs (International League) players
Louisville Colonels (minor league) players
1875 births
1936 deaths
People from Montgomery County, New York
People from Canajoharie, New York